Joan I (8 May 1326 – 29 September 1360, Chateau d'Argilly) was ruling Countess of Auvergne and Boulogne from 1332 to 1360 and Queen of France by her marriage to King John II.

Life
She was the daughter of William XII, Count of Auvergne and Boulogne, by his wife, Margaret, a sister of Philip III of Navarre. She inherited the counties of Auvergne and Boulogne after the death of her father.

Her first husband was Philip of Burgundy, who held the title Count of Auvergne by virtue of their marriage. They had one surviving child, Philip, who would be for much of his brief life Duke of Burgundy.

Following the death of her husband, Joan married John, Duke of Normandy on 9 February 1350. This was a second marriage for them both. John's first wife, Bonne of Bohemia, had died of Black Death and had left him with eight children, so there was little pressure for Joan to give birth to a son and heir. Upon her husband's ascension to the French throne as John II, she became Queen consort of France on 22 August 1350.

Joan's son Philip became a ward of the King. She had three children with King John, two girls and an unnamed son, all of whom died young. Joan died in 1360. Her possessions were inherited by her son.

Issue
By her first husband, Philip, Joan had the following issue:
 Joan (134411 September 1360), who was engaged to Amadeus VI of Savoy but was ultimately dismissed and lived out her life in a convent at Poissy
 Margaret (b. 1345), who died young
 Philip I of Burgundy (134621 November 1361), who was married to Margaret III of Flanders

By her second husband, John, Joan had two short-lived daughters, Blanche (November 1350) and Catherine (1352), and a short-lived son (1353).

References

Sources

|-

|-

1326 births
1360 deaths
Joan
French queens consort
Duchesses of Aquitaine
Duchesses of Normandy
Countesses of Anjou
Countesses of Maine
Countesses of Boulogne
French suo jure nobility
14th-century women rulers
14th-century French people
14th-century French women
Burials at the Basilica of Saint-Denis